This is a list of Sri Lankan provincial governors.

 List of Governors of Central Province
 List of Governors of Eastern Province
 List of Governors of North Central Province
 List of Governors of North Eastern Province
 List of Governors of North Western Province
 List of Governors of Northern Province, Sri Lanka
 List of Governors of Sabaragamuwa
 List of Governors of Southern Province
 List of Governors of Uva
 List of Governors of Western Province